The meridian 65° east of Greenwich is a line of longitude that extends from the North Pole across the Arctic Ocean, Europe, Asia, the Indian Ocean, the Southern Ocean, and Antarctica to the South Pole.

The 65th meridian east forms a great circle with the 115th meridian west.

From Pole to Pole
Starting at the North Pole and heading south to the South Pole, the 65th meridian east passes through:

{| class="wikitable plainrowheaders"
! scope="col" width="115" | Co-ordinates
! scope="col" | Country, territory or sea
! scope="col" | Notes
|-
| style="background:#b0e0e6;" | 
! scope="row" style="background:#b0e0e6;" | Arctic Ocean
| style="background:#b0e0e6;" |
|-
| 
! scope="row" | 
| Graham Bell Island, Franz Josef Land, Arkhangelsk Oblast
|-
| style="background:#b0e0e6;" | 
! scope="row" style="background:#b0e0e6;" | Barents Sea
| style="background:#b0e0e6;" |
|-
| 
! scope="row" | 
| Severny Island, Novaya Zemlya, Arkhangelsk Oblast
|-
| style="background:#b0e0e6;" | 
! scope="row" style="background:#b0e0e6;" | Kara Sea
| style="background:#b0e0e6;" |
|-
| 
! scope="row" | 
| Nenetsia, Yamalo-Nenetsia, Komi, Khantia-Mansia, Sverdlovsk Oblast, Tyumen Oblast, Kurgan Oblast
|-
| 
! scope="row" | 
| Kostanay Region, Karaganda Region, Kyzylorda Region
|-
| 
! scope="row" | 
| Navoiy Region, Buxoro Region, Qashqadaryo Region
|-
| 
! scope="row" | 
| Lebap Region
|-
| 
! scope="row" | 
| Badghis Province, Faryab Province, Ghor Province, Helmand Province, Kandahar Province
|-
| 
! scope="row" | 
| Balochistan
|-
| style="background:#b0e0e6;" | 
! scope="row" style="background:#b0e0e6;" | Indian Ocean
| style="background:#b0e0e6;" |
|-
| style="background:#b0e0e6;" | 
! scope="row" style="background:#b0e0e6;" | Southern Ocean
| style="background:#b0e0e6;" |
|-
| 
! scope="row" | Antarctica
| Australian Antarctic Territory, claimed by 
|-
|}

See also
64th meridian east
66th meridian east

e065 meridian east